For the 1986–87 West Ham United F.C. season in English football, West Ham United finished 15th in the league.

Season summary
John Lyall had made no signings during the close season, and it stayed that way until Stewart Robson was added in January. He was joined two months later by other new signings Gary Strodder, Tommy McQueen and Ireland international Liam Brady.

In this season which saw many player ravaged by injury, several academy players got their chance to play, including Kevin Keen, Paul Ince and future captain Steve Potts.
 
The West Ham fans were so disappointed with the team's underachievement during the season that Billy Bonds was voted Hammer of the Year, even though he only made 17 league and 7 cup appearances for the team.

Tony Cottee was the club's top scorer with 22 league goals and 28 in all competitions, but his strike partner Frank McAvennie disappointed with just seven league goals (11 in all competitions) after being the top flight's second-highest scorer the previous campaign. This was a large factor in the Hammers finishing a lowly 15th in the league, just a year after finishing third and being just four points short of their first top division title.

League table

Results
West Ham United's score comes first

Football League First Division

FA Cup

League Cup

Squad

1986-87
West Ham United
West Ham United
West Ham United